Monty Sharma (born 17 April 1970) is a music composer from India scoring music for Bollywood. He is popular for being the background music composer for Black (2005), Ram-Leela (2013) and music director for Saawariya (2007). He is cousin of composer Mithoon & nephew of famous music composer Pyarelal Sharma of popular Indian music composer duo Laxmikant–Pyarelal.

Early life
Monty Sharma was born on 17 April 1970 in Mumbai. He started learning music at the age of five and had the opportunity to learn under the guidance of his grand father Pandit Ram Prasad Sharma. Monty is nephew of Pyarelal Ramprasad Sharma of Laxmikant-Pyarelal fame. Monty started his career as a professional keyboard player with Laxmikant-Pyarelal for the film Mr. India at the age of sixteen. He worked with all the well known music directors such as Laxmikant Pyeralal, R.D. Burman, Rajesh Roshan, Nadeem Shravan, Jatin–Lalit, Ismail Darbar, Sanjeev Darshan for many bollywood films.

He was a member of judges' panel of the popular reality show STAR Voice of India 2.

Career

Background music composer
2018 - Genius
2017 - Blue Mountains
2017 - JD
 2016 - Final Cut of Director
 2016 - Pratichhaya
 2016 - Ek Tha Hero
 2016 - Shaukeen Kaminay
 2015 - Hawaizaada
 2014 - Spark
 2013 - Ram-Leela
 2008 - U Me Aur Hum
 2007 - Saawariya
 2007 - Apne
 2005 - Lucky: No Time for Love
 2005 - Black
 2002 - Devdas

Music director
 2017 - Shrestha Bangali
 2013 - Spark
 2012 - Run Bhola Run
 2010 - Mirch
 2009 - Vaada Raha
 2008 - Heroes
 2008 - Chamku
 2008 - Naughty @ 40
 2008 - Fox
 2008 - Right Yaaa Wrong
 2007 - Saawariya
 2005 - Black

Awards
Won
 2006 - Filmfare Award for Best Background Score for the film Black
 2006 - Screen Award for Best Background Music for the film Black
 2006 - IIFA Award for Best Background Score for the film Black
 2006 - Zee Cine Award for Best Background Music for the film Black
 2008 - Filmfare RD Burman Award for New Music Talent for the film Saawariya

Nominated
 2008 - Filmfare Award for Best Music Director for the film Saawariya
 2008 - Set Max Stardust Award for Music for the film Saawariya
 2014 - LifeOk Screen Awards for best background score for the film Goliyon Ki Raasleela Ram-leela
 2014 - Filmfare award for best background score for the film Goliyon Ki Raasleela Ram-leela

References

External links 

 
 Monty Sharma Music Director - Official Website

Indian film score composers
Living people
1970 births